St Peter Mancroft is a parish church in the Church of England, in the centre of Norwich, Norfolk. After the two cathedrals, it is the largest church in Norwich. It was originally established by the then Earl of East Anglia, Ralph de Gael between 1066 and 1075. It was later rebuilt, between 1430 and 1455. It stands on a slightly elevated position, next to the market place.

St Peter Mancroft is a member of the Greater Churches Group.

Description
The present building was begun in 1430, on the site of an existing church, and consecrated in 1455. It is an ambitious building, 180 feet long and ashlar faced with a tower at the west end. It is a Grade I listed building.

It has a Norman foundation dating from 1075, a 1463 font, a 1573 Flemish tapestry and medieval glass. The North transept displays a remarkable collection of church silver (one of the finest of any parish church in the country) including the Gleane and Thistle cups, as well as memorabilia associated with its most famous parishioner, the physician-philosopher Thomas Browne, author of Religio Medici (1642).  The small lead-covered  spire with flying buttresses was added by A.E. Street in 1896.

In 1850 two L-shaped trenches  accommodating a number of acoustic jars were discovered beneath the wooden floor on which the choir stalls had previously stood.  The earthenware jars were built into its walls at intervals of  about three feet, with the mouths facing into the trenches.

Bells
St Peter Mancroft has a ring of fourteen Whitechapel bells in the western tower, eleven of which date from 1775 and the latest of which dates from 1997. St Peter Mancroft is important in the history of change ringing because in 1715, 5040 changes of Plain Bob Triples were rung for the first time, in 3 hours and 17 minutes, as recorded in an inscription in the tower. Subsequently, the first complete peals to the change ringing systems known as Grandsire and Stedman were also rung in St Peter Mancroft.

Supernatural folklore is linked to the bells in St Peter Mancroft. In the story "Our Bells" authored by Mark Knights, which featured in the undated booklet (circa 1894) "Norfolk Stories", Knight writes:

The story tells of how a nobleman, fallen upon hard times, unwittingly tries to rob his own brother, but stays his hand after hearing the moving and beautiful Christmas Eve peal of bells. He subsequently assists in the ringing of the New Year's Eve peal, and bequeaths a sum of money to ensure that a jug of spiced ale  is made available to future bell-ringers on that date. The story is recounted by a ghostly descendant of the sexton who was in residence when these events occurred.

In 2018 the Mancroft Ringing Discovery Centre was opened, to promote the history of the bell-tower and to train a new generation of bell-ringers.

Incumbents

Hugh Casselton 1572 - 1588
William Wells 1598 - 1620
Thomas Tenison 1670 - 1680
John Connould 1683 - 1708
John Jeffrery 1714 - 1723
Charles John Chapman 1805 - 1826
John Watson Bowman 1826 - 1848
Charles Turner 1848 - 1878
Sidney Pelham 1879 - 1881
Henry Neville 1881 - 1884
Frederick Baggalley 1884 - 1890
William Pelham-Burn 1890 - 1901
Frederick James Meyrick 1901 - 1929
Hugh McMullan 1929 - 1940
Vacant 1940 - 1945
John Waddington 1945 - 1958
Kenneth Wilkinson Riddle 1959 - 1960
Frank Sydney Jarvis 1960 - 1965
William John Westwood 1965 - 1975
David Sharp 1975 - 1998
Peter W Nokes 1999 - 2015
Robert Avery 2015 - 2017
Ian Bentley 2017 - 2018
Edward Carter 2018 – present

Choir
There was once a large male voice choir which disbanded in 2000, though music is still an essential part of worship with the majority of the services being sung by one of the choirs at the Church. The baroque style organ, one of the finest of its kind, means that St Peter Mancroft is also an exceptional concert venue with many concerts being held all the year round.

Organ

A new organ by Peter Collins was installed in 1984. The specification can be found on the National Pipe Organ Register.

Organists
 William Pleasants 1708 - 1717 (son of Thomas Pleasants, organist of Norwich Cathedral)
 Humphrey Cotton 1717 - 1720 (afterwards organist of Norwich Cathedral)
 George Baker 1720 - ????
 Samuel Cook ???? - 1780
 Edward Beckwith 1780 - 1793 (acting organist from 1769)
 John Christmas Beckwith 1794 - 1808 (afterwards organist of Norwich Cathedral)
 John Charles Beckwith 1809 - 1819 (son of the above)
 Alfred Pettet 1819 - 1837
 Samuel Critchfield, Junior 1837 - 1851
 James Harcourt 1851 - 1877 (afterwards organist of Wymondham Abbey 1880 - 1881)
 Edward Bunnett 1877 - 1908
 Richard John Maddern-Williams, F.R.C.O 1908 - 1922 (formerly assistant at Wells Cathedral)
 Frank Edward Newman 1922 - 1926
 Richard John Maddern-Williams, F.R.C.O 1926 - 1941 
 Charles Joseph Romaine Coleman 1942 - 1959 (and jointly assistant organist at Norwich Cathedral)
 Kenneth Ryder 1963 - 2005
 Matthew Pitts 2006 - 2009
 Julian Haggett 2009–present

Assistant organists
 Charles Robert Palmer 1899 - 1901
 W. Percy Jones 1910 - ca. 1921 - ????
 Andrew Benians
 Roger Rayner
 Tim Patient 1990 - 2005

References

External links
 
 Book review article about the medieval stained glass in the church https://web.archive.org/web/20080704061719/http://www.vidimus.org/archive/issue_1_2006/issue_1_2006-04.html

Saint Peter Mancroft
15th-century church buildings in England
Grade I listed churches in Norfolk